The Triton 25, also called the Pearson 25, is an American trailerable sailboat, that was designed by Gary Mull and first built in 1984. The design is out of production.

Production
The boat was built by Pearson Yachts in the United States.

The Triton 25 is a development of the US Yachts US 25 and the Buccaneer 250, with the Triton 25 actually built from tooling and molds purchased from US Yachts.

The Pearson Yachts series of Triton boats were named for the Alberg Triton, which had been introduced in 1958.

Design
The Triton 25 is a small recreational keelboat, built predominantly of fiberglass, with wood trim. It has a masthead sloop rig, an internally-mounted spade-type rudder and a fixed fin keel. It displaces  and carries  of ballast.

The boat is normally fitted with a small  outboard motor for docking and maneuvering.

The design has sleeping provisions for five people, with a double "V"-berth in the bow cabin, a main cabin, port side, drop-down dinette table that forms a double berth and a starboard, aft quarter berth. The galley is located on the starboard side amidships and is equipped with a two-burner stove and a sink. The enclosed head is located just aft of the bow cabin on the port side.

The boat has a PHRF racing average handicap of 213 with a high of 213 and low of 213.

Operational history
In a 2010 review Steve Henkel wrote, "A large foretriangle and a blade-like small mainsail gives the appearance of a fast racer, but in reality the boat does not stand out as a particularly fast boat ... The pinched bow gives too little room for a full V-berth; use it for small kids only."

See also
List of sailing boat types
Related development
Triton 22
Similar sailboats
Tanzer 25

References

Keelboats
1980s sailboat type designs
Sailing yachts
Trailer sailers
Sailboat type designs by Gary Mull
Sailboat types built by Pearson Yachts